Frolosh Point (‘Nos Frolosh’ \'nos 'fro-losh\) is the point forming the north side of the entrance to Galata Cove on the northeast coast of Anvers Island in the Palmer Archipelago, Antarctica.

The point is named after the settlement of Frolosh in western Bulgaria.

Location
British mapping in 1980.

Maps
 British Antarctic Territory.  Scale 1:200000 topographic map.  DOS 610 Series, Sheet W 64 62.  Directorate of Overseas Surveys, UK, 1980.
 Antarctic Digital Database (ADD). Scale 1:250000 topographic map of Antarctica. Scientific Committee on Antarctic Research (SCAR). Since 1993, regularly upgraded and updated.

References
 Frolosh Point. SCAR Composite Gazetteer of Antarctica.
 Bulgarian Antarctic Gazetteer. Antarctic Place-names Commission. (details in Bulgarian, basic data in English)

External links
 Frolosh Point. Copernix satellite image

Headlands of the Palmer Archipelago
Bulgaria and the Antarctic